Fagus lucida is a species of tree in the family Fagaceae. Seeds and young leaves are edible.

References

lucida
Trees of China
Endemic flora of China